|}

The Preis der Diana is a Group 1 flat horse race in Germany open to three-year-old thoroughbred fillies. It is run at Düsseldorf over a distance of 2,200 metres (about 1 mile and 3 furlongs), and it is scheduled to take place each year in early August.

It is Germany's equivalent of The Oaks, a famous race in England.

History
The event was established in 1857, and it was originally contested at Tempelhof over 2,000 metres. It was transferred to Hoppegarten in 1868.

The race was staged at Grunewald for a short period after World War I, and it returned to Hoppegarten in 1923. It was abandoned in 1945 and 1946, and it took place at Düsseldorf in 1947. It began a long period at Mülheim in 1948.

The present system of race grading was introduced in Germany in 1972, and the Preis der Diana was initially classed at Group 2 level. Its distance was extended to 2,100 metres in 1973, and to 2,200 metres in 1977.

The Preis der Diana was promoted to Group 1 status in 2001. It was held at Hamburg in 2004 and 2005, and it moved to Düsseldorf in 2006. It was switched to early August in 2008, having taken place previously in late May or early June.

Records
Leading jockey (6 wins):
 Andrasch Starke – Night Petticoat (1996), Elle Danzig (1998), Flamingo Road (1999), Next Gina (2003), Rosenreihe (2008), Lacazar (2017)

Leading trainer (11 wins):
 Heinz Jentzsch – Brisanz (1962), Sabera (1964), Indra (1965), Schönbrunn (1969), Idrissa (1975), Leticia (1980), Slenderella (1984, dead-heat), Padang (1985), Comprida (1986), Longa (1992), Risen Raven (1994)
 (note: the trainers of some of the early winners are unknown)

Leading owner (16 wins):
 Hauptgestüt Graditz – Das Veilchen (1871), Vergissmeinnicht (1876), Glocke (1883), Hildburg (1885), Närrin (1887), Glöcknerin (1890), Forelle (1892), Waschfrau (1895), Pfaueninsel (1897), Waldkatze (1908), Angostura (1911), Adresse (1916), Alpenrose (1922), Stromschnelle (1930), Sichel (1931), Landmädel (1937)

Winners since 1969

Earlier winners

 1857: Sinope
 1858: Lavant
 1859: Isabella
 1860: Margarethe
 1861: Doloritha
 1862: Fullsail
 1863: Last Pippin
 1864: Sweet Katie
 1865: Emiliana
 1866: La Stella
 1867: Moawija
 1868: Bessy Giles
 1869: Lady Bird
 1870: Caro Dame
 1871: Das Veilchen
 1872: Libelle
 1873: Zwietracht
 1874: Hamadryade
 1875: Germania
 1876: Vergissmeinnicht
 1877: Chere Amie
 1878: Altona
 1879: Illona
 1880: Mereny
 1881: Dombrowa
 1882: Flaminia
 1883: Glocke
 1884: Gabernie
 1885: Hildburg
 1886: Matutina
 1887: Närrin
 1888: Herzdame
 1889: Eintracht
 1890: Glöcknerin
 1891: Zenobia
 1892: Forelle
 1893: Ilse
 1894: Migräne
 1895: Waschfrau
 1896: Seemärchen
 1897: Pfaueninsel
 1898: Gudrun
 1899: Hut Ab
 1900: Ordonnanz
 1901: Lore
 1902: Eccola
 1903: Belomantie
 1904: Lucca
 1905: Princess Heiling
 1906: Ibidem
 1907: Hochzeit
 1908: Waldkatze
 1909: Ladylike
 1910: Letizia
 1911: Angostura
 1912: Einsicht
 1913: Orchidee
 1914: Mon Desir
 1915: Amphora
 1916: Adresse
 1917: Ayesha
 1918: Edderitz
 1919: Tulipan
 1920: Orla
 1921: Himmelblau
 1922: Alpenrose
 1923: Falada
 1924: Ostrea
 1925: Melanie
 1926: Note
 1927: Libertas
 1928: Aditja
 1929: Antonia
 1930: Stromschnelle
 1931: Sichel
 1932: Faienza
 1933: Ausflucht
 1934: Lehnsherrin
 1935: Dornrose
 1936: Nereide
 1937: Landmädel
 1938: Adlerfee
 1939: Tatjana
 1940: Schwarzgold
 1941: Scilla
 1942: Leibwache
 1943: Contessa Pilade
 1944: Yngola
 1945–46: no race
 1947: Königswiese
 1948: Aralia
 1949: Asterblüte
 1950: Erlenkind
 1951: Armgard
 1952: Jana
 1953: Naxos
 1954: Wildbahn
 1955: Lustige
 1956: Liebeslied
 1957: Thila
 1958: Ivresse
 1959: Sommerblume
 1960: Santa Cruz
 1961: Meraviglia
 1962: Brisanz
 1963: Lis
 1964: Sabera
 1965: Indra
 1966: Ordenstreue
 1967: On Dit
 1968: Ipanema

See also

 List of German flat horse races

References
 Racing Post:

 galopp-sieger.de – Preis der Diana.
 horseracingintfed.com – International Federation of Horseracing Authorities – Preis der Diana (2018).
 pedigreequery.com – Preis der Diana.
 tbheritage.com – Preis der Diana.

Flat horse races for three-year-old fillies
Horse races in Germany
Recurring sporting events established in 1857
1857 establishments in Germany